is the 17th single by Japanese entertainer Miho Nakayama. Written by Ryō Asuka, the single was released on January 15, 1990, by King Records.

Background and release
"Midnight Taxi" was Nakayama's final single to be released on 7" vinyl EP format. It was released to coincide with her Coming of Age Day.

"Midnight Taxi" became Nakayama's sixth No. 1 on Oricon's weekly singles chart. It sold over 181,000 copies and was certified Gold by the RIAJ.

Track listing
All songs are written by Ryō Asuka and arranged by Tomoji Sogawa.

Charts
Weekly charts

Year-end charts

Certification

References

External links

1990 singles
1990 songs
Japanese-language songs
Miho Nakayama songs
King Records (Japan) singles
Oricon Weekly number-one singles